Lysobacter agri is a Gram-positive, rod-shaped, aerobic and motile bacterium from the genus of Lysobacter which has been isolated from soil from a field of the Kyung Hee University in Korea.

References

Bacteria described in 2015
Xanthomonadales